The Hard Easy either refers to:
 "The Hard Easy" (Adventure Time), an episode of an animated television series
 The Hard Easy (film), an independent film directed by released in 2006, directed by Ari Ryan

See also
 The hard–easy effect, a cognitive bias
 The Hard and the Easy (2005 album)
 Harder Than Easy (2009 album)